Saperda inornata is a species of beetle in the family Cerambycidae. It was described by Thomas Say in 1824. It is known from Canada and the United States. It feeds on Populus tremuloides.

Subspecies
 Saperda inornata unicolor Felt & Joutel, 1904
 Saperda inornata inornata Say, 1824

References

inornata
Beetles described in 1824